The Hayward Gay Prom is a dance held for LGBT youth. It takes place in Hayward, California every year, and was established in 1995.

History

The Hayward Gay Prom is one of the oldest continually running gay proms in the United States. Ken Athey, a gay man and youth counsellor, founded the event. According to Athey, his goal was to create a safe space for LGBT youth to enjoy prom without discrimination.

It has been held at Centennial Hall and Chabot College.

Students aged up to 20 years old may attend the event. Many LGBTQ organizations attend and conduct outreach and facilitate activities at the prom. Everyone is welcome, and parents are encouraged to attend or volunteer in support of their children. In 2014, the director for Project Eden predicted that more than 300 youth aged 14 to 20 would be attending the prom that year.

A documentary film on the prom, Now We Can Dance: The Story of the Hayward Gay Prom, was created and shown at the 2013 San Francisco International LGBT Film Festival

Purpose

The Hayward Gay Prom is an alternative prom where students can celebrate without fear of discrimination. The director for Project Eden stated, "It's a needed event because the young people need a place to go to where they feel safe and accepted".

Controversy

When the event was first established, people in opposition of the prom sported homophobic signs and wore rubber gloves and masks, a common anti-gay protest tactic utilized in the '90s. Local law enforcement and older LGBTQ members had to stand in between protesters and the prom attendees.  Attendees were forced to run inside the event, and some kids opted not to attend the prom in order to avoid harassment they experienced in school from students and teachers. When the organization changed the location of the prom the number of protesters decreased, and for the first time at the 20th annual Hayward Gay Prom there were zero protesters. The overall acceptance and support for the event and the community is increasing.

References

External links

Website
Now We Can Dance

LGBT culture in the San Francisco Bay Area
History of Hayward, California
1995 establishments in California
Annual events in California
LGBT events in California
Organizations based in Hayward, California
Youth culture in the United States
Culture of Hayward, California
Youth events
Youth in the United States
School dances
Recurring events established in 1995
LGBT youth
Prom